Rahmanniyeh and Rahmaniyeh may refer to:
 Rahmaniyeh, Khuzestan
 Rahmaniyeh-ye Feysali, Khuzestan Province
 Rahmaniyeh-ye Kabi, Khuzestan Province
 Rahmaniyeh-ye Zabun, Khuzestan Province
 Rahmanniyeh, Razavi Khorasan